Elophila atlantica is a moth in the family Crambidae. It was described by Eugene G. Munroe in 1972. It is found on North America, where it has been recorded from Nova Scotia, Florida, Maine, Maryland and South Carolina.

Adults have been recorded on wing in March and from June to August.

References

Acentropinae
Moths described in 1972
Moths of North America